Sal-like protein 2 is a protein that in humans is encoded by the SALL2 gene.

References

Further reading 

 
 
 
 
 
 

Transcription factors